The Dodgeball World Championship is a dodgeball competition  for both men's and women's national teams. The event is organised by the World Dodgeball Federation, the sport's global governing body.

It was initially an open event, but stopped being an open event as the membership grew, and now works by qualification. In 2021, WDBF's membership reached 80 members, all also members of the relevant continental federations.

While foam was the only format used in previous editions, starting with 2022, the Dodgeball World Championship would be contested in two categories, foam and cloth.

Winners
Below is a list of winners since the first event in 2012.

Medal table

Men (foam)

Women (foam)

Mixed (foam)

Men (cloth)

Women (cloth)

Mixed (cloth)

References

Recurring sporting events established in 2012
World championships
Dodgeball